The Southeast Asia Interdisciplinary Development Institute Graduate School of Organization Development and Planning (also known as the SAIDI Graduate School of OD&P or SAIDI) is a graduate school in Antipolo, Rizal Province, Philippines.

History
In 1965, the Summer Educational Media Institute (SEMI) opened as a specialized program in educational media and technology for educators all over the Philippines. Masteral and doctoral students of the Ateneo de Manila University, the University of Santo Tomas, and Philippine Christian University became the first learners of educational media and technology at SEMI.

In 1972, Sr. Jacqueline E. Blondin, MIC, Founding Director of SEMI, decided to shift SEMI's thrust from education to organization development. In the proposed program, the systems theory, which is used as a founding principle of instruction development, was adapted and applied to organizations.

In September 1975, SAIDI School of OD began accepting students from Southeast Asia and offered two master's programs following the "Open Learning Philosophy" using mixed media of print modules, oral instruction, and electronic technology. In 1976, the Ministry of Education encouraged SAIDI to offer a postgraduate degree program in education.

For the first eight years of operation, SAIDI was located in Arzobispo, Real, and General Luna Streets in Intramuros, Manila. In June 1983, the school moved to Antipolo in the province of Rizal.

Student population
From 1978 to 2004, SAIDI enrollees amounted to 572, broken down as follows: 35 enrollees in 2004; 282 from 1994 to 2003; and 255 from 1978 to 1993. Currently, there are 324 Ph.D. students, 81 MA/Ph.D. combined students, and 167 MA students.

Academic programs
SAIDI offers the following graduate degree programs:

Doctor of Philosophy in Organization Development and Planning
Master of Arts-Doctor of Philosophy in Organization Development and Planning
Master of Arts in Organization Development and Planning
Master of Arts in Instructional Development and Technology

References

External links
SAIDI Website

Graduate schools in the Philippines
Business schools in the Philippines
Distance education institutions based in the Philippines
Educational institutions established in 1965
Schools in Antipolo
1965 establishments in the Philippines